Live Steam & Outdoor Railroading magazine (formerly Live Steam Magazine) is a magazine published in the United States that was founded in 1966. The magazine is devoted to the live steam hobby as well as to other uses of miniature and full-size steam equipment.

Origin
Live Steam was originally started as the Live Steam Newsletter in the early 1960s by Pershing Scott as a mimeographed newsletter. In August 1966, Scott gave the publishing rights of the newsletter to William Fitt. By 1967 the newsletter had expanded into magazine format with the name being changed to Live Steam Magazine.

Present day
In 2005, the name was changed to Live Steam & Outdoor Railroading. It is currently published bi-monthly, in full color, with a press run of slightly over 10,000 as of December 2004.

See also
 List of railroad-related periodicals
 Backyard railway
 Model engineering
 Rideable miniature railway

References

External links 
 
 Publisher Information

Bimonthly magazines published in the United States
Rail transport modelling publications
Hobby magazines published in the United States
Live steam
Magazines established in 1966
Magazines published in Michigan
Newsletters